Taxi 13 is a 1954 Swedish crime drama film directed by Börje Larsson and starring Elof Ahrle, Signe Hasso, Margit Carlqvist and Birgitta Valberg. It was shot at the Centrumateljéerna Studios in Stockholm. The film's sets were designed by the art director Nils Nilsson.

Synopsis
A Stockholm taxi driver sets out to find out who murdered one of his colleagues.

Cast
 Elof Ahrle as Johan Alm
 Signe Hasso as 	Agneta
 Margit Carlqvist as 	Vera 
 Birgitta Valberg as 	Britt-Marie
 Bengt Blomgren as 	Fredrik
 Sten Gester as 	Man in Trenchcoat
 Hjördis Petterson as 	Mia Lundgren
 Ulf Johansson as 	Quarrelsome Man
 Nancy Dalunde as Quarrelsome Wife
 Ninni Löfberg as 	Mrs. Vestman
 Arthur Hultling as Victor Nilsson
 Sif Ruud as 	Miss Haglund
 Ingvar Kjellson as 	Artist
 Siegfried Fischer as	Axel a.k.a. Sunshine 
 Alf Östlund as 	Silent Marie
 Sven Holmberg as 	Taxi Driver
 Arvid Richter as 	Taxi Driver
 Sture Djerf as 	Hermansson
 Brigitte Ornstein as 	Office Girl
 Karl Erik Flens as Exuberant Man
 Olle Teimert as Young Man Trying to Avoid Paying 
 Kjell Nordenskiöld as 	Young Man at Party 
 Birger Åsander as	Mr. Vestman
 Rolf Tourd as 	Vera's Street Friend
 Märta Dorff as 	Taxi Exchange Manager
 Svea Holst as 	Cyclist Discovering the Corpse	
 Pelle Svedlund as 	Embessler
 Elsa Winge as 	Mrs. Lindblad
 Alva Berggren as 	Waitress Giving Notice
 Arthur Fischer as	Taxi Owner
 Claes Esphagen as 	Garage Washer
 Bo Gunnar Eriksson as 	Tommy
 Lissi Alandh as 	Hermansson's Woman
 Torsten Lilliecrona as Police Lieutenant Johansson

References

Bibliography 
 Qvist, Per Olov & von Bagh, Peter. Guide to the Cinema of Sweden and Finland. Greenwood Publishing Group, 2000.

External links 
 

1954 films
Swedish drama films
1954 drama films
1950s Swedish-language films
Films directed by Börje Larsson
Swedish black-and-white films
Films set in Stockholm
1950s Swedish films